The Aeroprakt A-22 Foxbat is a Ukrainian two-seat, high-wing, tricycle landing gear ultralight aircraft that was designed by Yuri Yakovlev and is manufactured by Aeroprakt. In the United States the A-22 is referred to as the Valor, while in the UK and Australia it is called the Foxbat. It has also been marketed as the Vision.
The Aeroprakt A-22 is supplied either as "ready-to-fly" factory built aircraft, or as a kit, consisting of 152 pieces. The kit can be built in about 500 man-hours.

The A-22 meets the definition of an FAI microlight.

Design and development
Aeroprakt of Kyiv began design of the A-22 in February 1990, with the first prototype making its maiden flight on 21 October 1996, and a German-certified version entering production in 1999.

The A-22's structure is almost completely metal with only the engine cowling, wing fillets and wheel spats being made of composites. The wings and control surfaces are fabric covered. The aircraft has excellent visibility, due to the large amount of glazing, including convex doors, that allow the occupants to look straight down. The A-22 uses a 3-axis control system, giving the pilot full control over the aircraft.

The kit comes with either the  Rotax 912UL or optionally the  Rotax 912ULS. The  Jabiru 2200 can also be fitted.

Originally the A-22 came fitted with a 40-litre inboard fuel tank behind the seats, although later models have wing tanks holding 37.5 litres per side. The propeller is a 3-blade composite ground adjustable KievProp. Dual controls are standard, using a single central "Y" yoke or optionally twin yoke control system.

Variants
A-22L2
A-22LS

Specifications (A-22 Valor, Rotax 912 ULS engine)

References

External links 

1990s Ukrainian ultralight aircraft
Foxbat
Single-engined tractor aircraft
High-wing aircraft